Patrick Toney (born March 14, 1990) is an American football coach who is the defensive backs coach for the Arizona Cardinals of the National Football League (NFL). He previously served as the co-defensive coordinator for the Florida Gators football team.

Coaching career

Sam Houston State
In 2015 he worked as the Safeties coach at Sam Houston State.

UTSA
Toney spent 2016 and 2017 as the safeties coach at UTSA.

Louisiana
In 2018 Toney joined the Ragin Cajuns as the safeties coach. In 2020 he was promoted to defensive coordinator and outside linebackers coach.

Florida 
Toney followed Billy Napier to the swamp and on December 6, 2021, Toney was hired as co-defensive coordinator and safeties coach for Florida.

Arizona Cardinals
In 2023, he became the safeties coach for the Arizona Cardinals.

References

External links 

Florida Gators bio

1990 births
Living people
People from San Diego
Southeastern Louisiana Lions football coaches
Sam Houston Bearkats football coaches
Louisiana Ragin' Cajuns football coaches
UTSA Roadrunners football coaches
Florida Gators football coaches
Coaches of American football from California